Gusev is a town and the administrative center of Gusevsky District of Kaliningrad Oblast, Russia, located at the confluence of the Pissa and Krasnaya Rivers, near the border with Poland and Lithuania, east of Chernyakhovsk. Population:

History
The settlement of Gumbinnen (from : pumpkin) in the Duchy of Prussia, a vassal duchy of the Kingdom of Poland, was first mentioned in a 1580 deed. A Protestant parish was established in Gumbinnen at the behest of the Hohenzollern thanks to Duke Albert of Prussia about 1545 and the first church was erected in 1582. It became part of Brandenburg-Prussia in 1618, remaining a fief of Poland.

From the 18th century, it was part of the Kingdom of Prussia. Between 1709 and 1711 the area was devastated by the Great Northern War plague outbreak and had to be redeveloped under the rule of the "Soldier King" Frederick William I of Prussia, who granted Gumbinnen town privileges in 1724 and from 1732 resettled the area with Salzburg Protestants, refugees from Salzburg, who had been expelled by Prince-Archbishop Count Leopold Anton von Firmian. The first filial church of the Salzburg Protestants was erected between 1752 and 1752, and was rebuilt  in 1840 in a Neoclassical style according to plans designed by Karl Friedrich Schinkel. The church was restored in 1995 by the Evangelical Lutheran Church in Russia, Ukraine, Kazakhstan and Central Asia.

From 1815, Gumbinnen was the capital of Regierungsbezirk Gumbinnen, an administrative district of the Province of East Prussia, and became part of the German Empire upon the unification of Germany in 1871. In 1860 the Prussian State railway line from Königsberg to Stallupönen (now Nesterov) was built and the route passed through Gumbinnen, causing the town to grow in economic importance in the region. By the end of the 19th century, Gumbinnen had a foundry, a machine shop, a furniture factory, a clothing mill, two sawmills, several brickworks, and a dairy.

During World War I the town was the site of the Battle of Gumbinnen, a major battle on the Eastern Front. The battle took place nearby in the opening days of the war in August 1914, and Gumbinnen was subsequently occupied by the Russian Imperial Army for several months. After the war, a power plant, the Ostpreußenwerk, was built in Gumbinnen and powered much of East Prussia. At the beginning of the Nazi era, Gumbinnen was designated a military sub-region of the Königsberg military area. Near the end of World War II, in 1944, the first of Gumbinnen's 24,000 residents began to flee from the advancing Red Army, and a Soviet air attack on October 16, 1944, caused heavy damage to the inner town area. On October 22, 1944, the town was taken by Soviet forces, who engaged in numerous vengeful atrocities against the civilian population before the Wehrmacht retook the town two days later. Although the German forces retook Gumbinnen and managed in late October to stabilize the battle line east of the town, it was quickly re-conquered by the Red Army during the great Soviet East Prussia offensive on 21 January 1945. During the Evacuation of East Prussia, the surviving German residents fled or were expelled.

Following the end of the war, under border changes promulgated at the Potsdam Conference in 1945, the northern part of the former province of East Prussia became a part of the Soviet Union, including Gumbinnen. The town was renamed Gusev, in honour of a Red Army captain, Sergei Ivanovich Gusev, who was killed in action near Gumbinnen in January 1945, and was posthumously given the award of Hero of the Soviet Union on April 19, 1945.

Administrative and municipal status

Within the framework of administrative divisions, Gusev serves as the administrative center of Gusevsky District. As an administrative division, it is incorporated within Gusevsky District as the town of district significance of Gusev.

Within the framework of municipal divisions, since June 10, 2013, the territories of the town of district significance of Gusev and of four rural okrugs of Gusevsky District are incorporated as Gusevsky Urban Okrug. Before that, the town of district significance was incorporated within Gusevsky Municipal District as Gusevskoye Urban Settlement.

Economy

Transportation
Gusev lies on the double-track, broad-gauge rail line connecting the Kaliningrad Oblast exclave through Lithuania and Belarus with the main contiguous territory of Russia.

The Yantar Special Economic Zone
In the 1990s the Yantar Special Economic Zone was established in Kaliningrad Oblast. Some of projects in the zone are located in Gusev, such as NPO CTS.

Notable people

 Kristijonas Donelaitis (1714–1780) a Prussian Lithuanian Lutheran pastor and poet
 Christian Daniel Rauch (1777–1857), German sculptor
 Otto von Corvin (1812–1886), German writer
 Gustav Albert Peter (1853–1937) a German botanist.
 Richard Friese (1854–1918) German animal and landscape painter
 Konrad Grallert von Cebrów (1865–1942), divisional commander in the Austro-Hungarian Army
 Gotthard Heinrici (1886–1971), German general
 Bruno Bieler (1888–1966), German general
 Max Liedtke (1894-1955), German army officer, one of the Righteous Among the Nations
 Werner Dankwort (1895–1986), German diplomat
 Winfried Mahraun (1907–1973) German diver who competed in the 1936 Summer Olympics
 Wilhelm Schöning (1908–1987) Oberstleutnant, commander of the 66th Panzergrenadier Regiment
 Karin Krebs (born 1943), German athlete
 Oleg Gazmanov (born 1951), Russian pop-singer, composer and poet
 Nikolay Tsukanov (born 1965) a Russian politician, psychologist, businessman, electrical welder and former governor of Kaliningrad Oblast
 Vladimir Vdovichenkov (born 1971), Russian actor

Twin towns and sister cities

Former twin towns:

Gusev had been twinned with:
 Kazlų Rūda, Lithuania

 Gołdap, Poland
 Pabianice, Poland

In March 2022, the Polish cities of Pabianice and Gołdap ended their partnership with Gusev as a response to the 2022 Russian invasion of Ukraine.

References

Notes

Sources

External links

Official website of Gusev 
Gusev Business Directory 
Unofficial website of Gusev 
Winter trip to Gusev town 

Cities and towns in Kaliningrad Oblast
Poland–Russia border crossings
Gusevsky District